Ten is the second and final album by American hip hop trio Clouddead. It was released on March 8, 2004 on Big Dada in the United Kingdom and on March 16, 2004 on Mush Records in the United States. "Dead Dogs Two" was released as a single from the album. The album peaked at number 17 on the UK Independent Albums Chart, as well as number 16 on the UK R&B Albums Chart.

Critical reception

At Metacritic, which assigns a weighted average score out of 100 to reviews from mainstream critics, Ten received an average score of 74, based on 22 reviews, indicating "generally favorable reviews".

Molloy Woodcraft of The Observer gave the album 4 stars out of 5, writing, "A mish-mash of odd found sounds, woozy synths and hip hop beats form a bed for a collective scattershot collage of musings on love, life and mortality". Ed Howard of Stylus Magazine said, "Having allowed hip-hop to fall pretty much entirely by the wayside, the trio has instead embraced the full strength of their abstract poetry and glitchy, junky, rock-informed musical landscapes." Chris Dahlen of Pitchfork gave the album a 7.8 out of 10, stating that "the strongest moments on Ten involve a sustain: sustained organ tones, long throbbing noises, stretches where the words trail off."

In February 2004, The Observer listed "Dead Dogs Two" as the "Song of the Month".

CMJ placed Ten at number 10 on the "Top 20 Albums of 2004" list. In 2015, Fact placed it at number 71 on the "100 Best Indie Hip-Hop Records of All Time" list.

Track listing

Personnel
Credits adapted from liner notes.

 Yoni Wolf (Why?) – vocals, production
 Adam Drucker (Doseone) – vocals, production
 David Madson (Odd Nosdam) – production
 Jel – additional contribution
 Jordan Dalrymple – additional contribution
 Josiah Wolf – additional contribution
 Robert Curcio – additional contribution

Charts

References

External links
 

2004 albums
Clouddead albums
Big Dada albums
Mush Records albums
Albums produced by Odd Nosdam